Groenhovenbad is an aquatic centre in Gouda, the Netherlands. 
It hosted from 21-28 March the 2016 Women's Water Polo Olympic Games Qualification Tournament.

References

External links
 official website

Swimming venues in the Netherlands
Sports venues in South Holland
Sport in Gouda, South Holland